Herbert Lee "J. R." Reed (born February 11, 1982) is a former American football safety. He was drafted by the Philadelphia Eagles in the fourth round of the 2004 NFL Draft. He played football at Hillsborough High School to later go on and play college football at South Florida, where he is the school's career leader in interceptions.

Reed has also been a member of the St. Louis Rams, Atlanta Falcons, New York Giants, Philadelphia Eagles, and New York Jets.

Professional career

First stint with Eagles
In early 2005, Reed suffered an injury which ended his 2005 season.  While jumping a fence near his home in Tampa, Reed cut the back of his knee and sustained damage to the peroneal nerve that affects movement in his lower leg and foot.

He returned to the Eagles with the aid of a special brace and played in the Pro Football Hall of Fame game against the Oakland Raiders on August 6, 2006.  Reed's comeback was cut short as the Eagles released him on the final day of cuts before the season.

St. Louis Rams
In October 2006, Reed was signed by the St. Louis Rams as a kick returner for the 2006 season, but he was cut after playing in six games.

Atlanta Falcons
Reed signed with the Atlanta Falcons in December of that year to provide depth for Atlanta's depleted secondary.  The Falcons cut him following the season.

New York Giants
He signed with the New York Giants for their 2007 training camp but was released on the final day of cuts.

Second stint with Eagles
The Eagles re-signed him the next day.  However, Reed muffed a critical punt late in the first game of the season against the Green Bay Packers.  This led to his subsequent release and the Eagles' signing of Reno Mahe.  However, he was re-signed within weeks to back up injured All-Pro safety Brian Dawkins.  Reed has since returned to the Eagles' special teams and has resumed his role of kick returner.  In a week 12 game against the New England Patriots, Reed was named the starter at the strong safety position when Sean Considine and Quintin Mikell could not play due to injuries.

Reed spent the first seven weeks of the 2008 season with the Eagles, appearing in five games and recording three tackles.  He was released on October 21 to make room for fullback Kyle Eckel.

New York Jets
Reed was signed by the New York Jets on December 10, 2008, after the team waived running back Marcus Mason.

References

External links
 

1982 births
Living people
Players of American football from Tampa, Florida
African-American players of American football
American football return specialists
American football safeties
South Florida Bulls football players
Philadelphia Eagles players
St. Louis Rams players
Atlanta Falcons players
New York Giants players
New York Jets players
21st-century African-American sportspeople
20th-century African-American people